The Madison Masonic Temple in Madison, South Dakota is a building from 1906. It was listed on the National Register of Historic Places in 1990. It was demolished in 2015 due to falling into disrepair.

It has also been known as Evergreen Lodge No. 17 A.F. & A.M..   It is a two-story masonry Classical Revival-style building on a raised basement, with a portico incorporating Ionic columns. Doors and windows are topped by flat brick arches with terra cotta keystones.  Terra cotta is also used in cornices and in plaques beside the building's portico.  It has a shallow roof being a parapet.

Which of several Masonic groups were meeting was originally indicated by colored lamps upon a metal pole rising from the center of the parapet.

References

Neoclassical architecture in South Dakota
Masonic buildings completed in 1906
Masonic buildings in South Dakota
Clubhouses on the National Register of Historic Places in South Dakota
National Register of Historic Places in Lake County, South Dakota
1906 establishments in South Dakota